Never Kiss Your Best Friend Season 2 is Indian web-series on ZEE5 starring Nakuul Mehta, Anya Singh, Karan Wahi, Jaaved Jaaferi, Nikki Walia and Sarah-Jane Dias. This series is based on Sumrit Shahi's book with the same name. Never Kiss Your Best Friend is directed by Harsh Dedhia, produced by 11:11 Productions.

Plot 
"This is the returning season of Never Kiss Your Best Friend where the story revolves around two best friends, Tanie and Sumer played by Anya Singh and Nakuul Mehta respectively. Tanie Brar has been through a series of highs and lows over the past two years, and not just because of the pandemic. Tanie was soaring with the success of her first book, when she broke up with her best friend turned boyfriend, Sumer. The two of them reunite incidentally after years of separation and are immediately at loggerheads with each other. Neither of them have been in contact in nearly two years."

Cast 
Anya Singh as Tanie Brar
Nakuul Mehta as Sumer Dhillion
Sarah Jane Dias as Lavanyaa Oberoi
Karan Wahi as Karan Malhotra
Sapna Pabbi as Alisha
Jaaved Jaaferi as Bittu Mama
Nikki Walia as Happy Brar
Deepti Bhatnagar as Sangeeta Malhotra
Nikkita Chadha as Manali
Vicky Modi as Gautam
Karanuday Jenjani as Rajeev Oberoi
Navaldeep Singh as Tittu
Rituraj Singh as Sumer's Father
Saddhika Syal as Myra

Reception 
Archika Khurrana from Times of India gave three and half star starting " A BINGE-WORTHY SEQUEL TO A MILLENNIAL ROM-COM". Shubham Kulkarni from Koimoi wrote" Nakuul Mehta & Anya Singh Suddenly Find A Soul Mid-Way Making This The Better Season." Priyakshi Sharma from PinkVilla wrote " Nakuul Mehta & Anya Singh are delightful as lovers-turned-foes." Manisha Lakhe from Money Control wrote "A refreshing story about love and friendship".

References

External Links 
 Never Kiss Your Best Friend (season 2) at IMDb
 Never Kiss Your Best Friend (Season 2) at ZEE5

Indian web series
Indian romantic drama films